The 2009 ADAC Zurich 24 Hours of Nürburgring is the 37th running of the 24 Hours of Nürburgring. It took place over May 23–24, 2009. Manthey Racing's #1 Porsche claimed honours in the SP7 class and was the overall victor, completing 155 laps over the 24 hours. Team Abt Sportsline and their #97 Audi claimed second overall and finished as top runner in the SP9 GT3 class. 118 of the 170 starters were classified.

Intro
For 2009, the organizers announced that they wanted to reduce the gap in speeds, by not accepting small capacity cars any more, and by slowing down the fastest classes, SP7 and SP8. Also, the new FIA GT3 and FIA GT4 classes were adopted, called SP9 and SP10. Some of the new rules are controversial, especially the fact that instead of the regular fuel pumps as used in any public station, the top teams have to use expensive equipment designed to equal the times needed to refill, meaning that an economic car is punished compared to a thirsty car. Due to the various rule changes, some teams have declined to take part, namely Zakspeed with their Viper.

Probably also due to the economic crisis, the number of entries is much lower than in previous years, with only 170 cars starting the race. Surprisingly, the pole was set by a Ford GT, followed closely by the four factory-entered Audi R8 LMS and two Porsche GT3 of the Manthey team. They have decided to enter their well-known RSR, which is basically a GT2 car, but now has about 70 hp less due to new air restrictors, and also a 997 GT3 Cup S, the version Porsche homologated for FIA GT3. For the first 19 hours, two of the Audis and the two Manthey Porsche battled for the lead within a lap, the pace likely to result in a new distance record. The Manthey #1 had been punished for approaching an accident site too quickly and had to wait 3 minutes in the box, but the decision was reverted later based on data logging evidence, with the lost time deducted from the results. Around 11:30, the #99 Audi which had a narrow lead was stopped by suspension problems. Following repairs this car finished in 5th position. This left the #97 Audi in second, and with the win in its class, 5 minutes behind the overall winner.

Race results
Class winners in bold.

References 

Nurburgring
Nürburgring 24 Hours
May 2009 sports events in Europe